Jorge Manuel da Silva Paixão Santos (born 19 December 1965), known as Paixão, is a Portuguese former footballer who played as a striker, currently manager of Kuwaiti Division One club Al-Yarmouk SC.

Playing career
Born in Almada, Setúbal District, Paixão's 11-year professional career was almost entirely spent in the Portuguese second and third divisions, representing Amora FC (two spells), C.F. União de Coimbra, Louletano D.C. and GD Bragança.

The exception to this was in the 1985–86 season, when he appeared three times as a substitute for Académica de Coimbra in the Primeira Liga. He retired in June 1995 at the age of 29, after a spell with amateurs Atlético Clube da Malveira.

Coaching career
Following retirement, Paixão moved into coaching. He first served as the assistant manager for two teams, before his first management role when in 2002 he was appointed head coach of Almada A.C. in the Setúbal Football Association. Over the next ten years he was in charge of several clubs in the third tier, and also had spells abroad in Angola with C.R. Caála and Qatar with Al-Mesaimeer SC.

Paixão was appointed at second-division side S.C. Farense in September 2013. In March of the following year he first reached the top flight with S.C. Braga who were in tenth place, leading the team to ninth position after winning only two of his ten league games in charge, but reaching the semi-finals of the Taça de Portugal, where they were defeated by Rio Ave FC.

On 14 May 2014, Braga announced that Paixão's contract would not be renewed. On 24 June 2014 he signed for Polish club Zawisza Bydgoszcz, winning the SuperCup shortly after by defeating Legia Warsaw 3–2.

Paixão moved back to his native country in October 2014 with S.C. Olhanense, leaving his post the following February. He took charge of Farense also in the second tier in June, agreeing to a mutual termination of his contract on 30 November.

On 30 December 2015, Paixão was appointed at C.D. Mafra (also for a second time, having previously been coach in 2010). The team were struggling prior to his arrival, and he was unable to prevent their relegation from the second division. At the end of July 2016, he was replaced.

Honours

Manager
Zawisza Bydgoszcz
Polish SuperCup: 2014

References

External links

1965 births
Living people
Sportspeople from Almada
Portuguese footballers
Association football forwards
Primeira Liga players
Liga Portugal 2 players
Segunda Divisão players
Amora F.C. players
Associação Académica de Coimbra – O.A.F. players
Louletano D.C. players
GD Bragança players
Portugal youth international footballers
Portuguese football managers
Primeira Liga managers
Liga Portugal 2 managers
C.D. Fátima managers
Atlético Clube de Portugal managers
C.F. Estrela da Amadora managers
S.C. Farense managers
S.C. Braga managers
S.C. Olhanense managers
Ekstraklasa managers
Zawisza Bydgoszcz managers
Mesaimeer SC managers
Al-Yarmouk SC (Kuwait) managers
Portuguese expatriate football managers
Expatriate football managers in Angola
Expatriate football managers in Qatar
Expatriate football managers in Poland
Expatriate football managers in China
Expatriate football managers in Rwanda
Expatriate football managers in Kuwait
Portuguese expatriate sportspeople in Angola
Portuguese expatriate sportspeople in Qatar
Portuguese expatriate sportspeople in Poland
Portuguese expatriate sportspeople in China
Portuguese expatriate sportspeople in Kuwait